Ululodes quadripunctatus, the four-spotted owlfly, is a species of owlfly in the tribe Ululodini. It is found in Central America and North America.

References

Further reading

 

Ascalaphidae
Articles created by Qbugbot
Insects described in 1839
Taxa named by Hermann Burmeister